Inherit the Wind  is the November 18, 1965 episode of the American television series Hallmark Hall of Fame directed by George Schaefer. A videotaped adaptation of the 1955 play of the same name, it shortened the text of the original 1955 play which was written as a parable fictionalizing the 1925 Scopes "Monkey" Trial as a means of discussing the 1950s McCarthy trials.

Plot summary

Cast
 Melvyn Douglas as Henry Drummond
 Ed Begley as Matthew Harrison Brady
 Murray Hamilton as E. K. Hornbeck
 John Randolph as Rev. Brown
 Burt Brinckerhoff as Bert Cates
 Diane Baker as Rachel Brown
 Adrienne King as Melinda

Awards
Emmy Awards
 Nominated:Outstanding Directorial Achievement in Drama - George Schaefer 
 Nominated:Outstanding Dramatic Program - George Schaefer (producer)
 Nominated:Outstanding Performance by an Actress in a Supporting Role in a Drama - Diane Baker 
 Nominated:Outstanding Single Performance by an Actor in a Leading Role in a Drama - Ed Begley
 Nominated:Outstanding Single Performance by an Actor in a Leading Role in a Drama - Melvyn Douglas

See also 

 List of American films of 1965
 Trial movies

Notes

External links
 
 
 Inherit the Wind On the Small Screen - 1965

1965 television films
1965 films
1965 drama films
1960s legal films
American legal drama films
American courtroom films
American films based on plays
Films about religion
Films about lawyers
American films based on actual events
Films à clef
Films directed by George Schaefer
Hallmark Hall of Fame episodes
Television remakes of films
United Artists films
Scopes Trial
Cultural depictions of John T. Scopes
Cultural depictions of Clarence Darrow
American drama television films
1960s English-language films
1960s American films